St. Eugene's Cathedral , also called the Cathedral of Saint Eugene of the Palma or simply Cathedral of Ciego de Ávila, is Roman Catholic cathedral in the city of Ciego de Ávila, in Cuba, located on Independencia Avenue by José Martí Park.

History
The first church built on the site dated to 1890. This building was demolished in 1947 to give space to a much larger church, designed by the architect Salvador Figueras, which opened in 1951. The church became a cathedral in 1996 as the seat of the newly-created Diocese of Ciego de Ávila. The church's most distinctive feature is its facade.

See also
List of cathedrals in Cuba
Roman Catholicism in Cuba

References

Roman Catholic cathedrals in Cuba
Buildings and structures in Ciego de Ávila
Roman Catholic churches completed in 1951
20th-century Roman Catholic church buildings in Cuba